Jennifer Pace (born 21 March 1958) is a Maltese athlete. She competed in the women's javelin throw at the 1984 Summer Olympics.

References

External links
 

1958 births
Living people
Athletes (track and field) at the 1984 Summer Olympics
Maltese female javelin throwers
Olympic athletes of Malta
World Athletics Championships athletes for Malta
Place of birth missing (living people)